Bilal Hayee is a Pakistani diplomat who is currently serving as ambassador of the Islamic Republic of Pakistan to Azerbaijan since June 2020.

References

Living people
Year of birth missing (living people)
Ambassadors of Pakistan to Azerbaijan
Place of birth missing (living people)